Pachycerosia lutulenta is a moth of the subfamily Arctiinae. It was described by Wileman and West in 1928. It is found in the Philippines.

References

Lithosiini
Moths described in 1928